Singu is a township of Thabeikkyin District, Mandalay Division, Myanmar. The capital is Singu.

References 

Townships of Mandalay Region